Axel Jacob Vigen Johnson (born 1948) is a Swedish politician and former member of the Riksdag, the national legislature. A member of the Left Party, he represented Uppsala County between October 2006 and June 2014.

References

1948 births
Living people
Members of the Riksdag 2006–2010
Members of the Riksdag 2010–2014
Members of the Riksdag from the Left Party (Sweden)